Totuskey is an unincorporated community in Richmond County, in the U.S. state of Virginia. The Totuskey Creek flows through the area.

References

Unincorporated communities in Virginia
Unincorporated communities in Richmond County, Virginia